The 2016–17 HockeyAllsvenskan season was the 12th season since the second tier of ice hockey in Sweden was renamed. The league featured 14 teams, each playing each other four times, for a total of 52 regular season games.

Participating teams

Regular season

Standings

Post-season

Finals
In the HockeyAllsvenskan finals, the first and second place teams from the regular season met in a best-of-five series, where the winner advanced to the SHL qualifiers, and the losing team continued to a playoff to the SHL qualifiers. The matches were held on 5 March, 7 March and 9 March.

Mora IK vs. BIK Karlskoga

HockeyAllsvenskan playoffs
In the HockeyAllsvenskan playoffs, teams 3–8 met in a single-round robin tournament. Teams 3–5 had an extra game on home-ice. The matches were held on 6–14 March. Teams also started with bonus points based on their position in the regular season standings. Team 3 began with three points, team 4 with two points, and team 5 with one point.

The winner of the group advanced to the playoff to the SHL qualifiers.

Playoff to the SHL qualifiers
In the playoff to the SHL qualifiers, the losing team from the HockeyAllsvenskan finals met the winning team from the HockeyAllsvenskan playoffs in a best-of-three series that were played on 16 March, 18 March and 20 March. The winning team advanced to the SHL qualifiers.

BIK Karlskoga vs. AIK

SHL qualifiers
In the SHL qualifiers, the winners of the HockeyAllsvenskan finals and the playoff to the SHL qualifiers were paired against teams 13 and 14 from the 2016–17 SHL season. Each pair played a best-of-seven series, with the winner qualifying for play in the 2017–18 SHL season, and the loser playing in the 2017–18 HockeyAllsvenskan season. These series began on 22 and 23 March, and were completed by 1 April. Rögle won their series, 4–0, to secure continued SHL play. Mora then won their series, 4–2, to qualify for SHL play for the first time since the 2007–08 season.

Leksands IF vs. Mora IK

Rögle BK vs. BIK Karlskoga

HockeyAllsvenskan qualifiers
Västerås and Södertälje, teams 13 and 14 from the regular season, were forced to defend their spots in HockeyAllsvenskan in the HockeyAllsvenskan qualifiers. Joining the two HockeyAllsvenskan teams were four challengers from third-tier league Hockeyettan, the winner of the Hockeyettan Finals (Huddinge IK) and the three surviving teams from the Hockeyettan playoffs.

References

HockeyAllsvenskan seasons
HockeyAllsvenskan
HockeyAllsvenskan